is a Japanese professional baseball pitcher for the Auckland Tuatara of the Australian Baseball League (ABL). He previously played for the Tokyo Yakult Swallows of the Nippon Professional Baseball(NPB).

Career

On December 2, 2019, he become free agent. On December 4, 2019, Muranaka joined for the Auckland Tuatara for the Australian Baseball League (ABL). In nine regular season appearances for the Tuatara, he started five games, going 2-2 with a 2.73 ERA over 29⅔ innings.

References

External links

 NPB.com

1987 births
Living people
Auckland Tuatara players
Japanese expatriate baseball players in New Zealand
Nippon Professional Baseball pitchers
Baseball people from Kanagawa Prefecture
Tokyo Yakult Swallows players
Waikiki Beach Boys players
Japanese expatriate baseball players in the United States